The Christian Game Developers Conference (CGDC) is an annual Conference for video game developers who profess the Christian religion. Attendees of the conference gather together to discuss how to improve their games through discussions, keynote speeches, and workshops.

History 
The Christian Game Developers Conference was founded in 2002 by computer engineer Tim Emmerich from Corvallis, Oregon, apparently with the goal of providing greater support and experimentation for Christian video games. In its first year, the conference consisted of 30 attendees, with subsequent years seeing attendances of 90 participants, "over 100" participants, and then 100 participants in the years 2003, 2004, and 2005, respectively. In 2011, the conference hosted around 85 individuals and in 2012, the number of attendees once again exceeded 100 people. In 2011, the event was held at George Fox University, and in 2013 it was hosted at Concordia University in Portland, Oregon.

Those attending the event consist of members from game studios who are explicitly Christian as well as individual developers from more mainstream, secular studios who themselves personally identify as Christian. Many attendees are motivated by the desire to change the wider perception of Christians and especially the negative stigma associated with Christian video games being poorly made. Developers evidently use the event as an opportunity to network with other Christians and to find a community of individuals who share their beliefs and experiences.

Debate over mission 
According to sources interviewed from within CGDC, there is a recurring debate at the conference regarding how evangelistic Christian games should be, if at all. Attendees seem to be in disagreement over whether their games should be overt in their Christian subject matter or more allegorical with a message they may present.

External links 
 Official event website

References 

Video game conferences
Video game development
Trade shows in the United States
Recurring events established in 2002
Christian video games